Peter Ankjær Bigaard, better known by his stage name Pede B (born in 1984), is a Danish rapper originating from Hellerup. Starting rapping at a young age, he took part in MC's Fight Night, winning the title three times in 2005, 2007 and 2009, becoming the only rapper to score a hat-trick of victories in the competition's history. He has cooperated with many rappers, and with his album Over Askeskyen very notably with DJ Noize. The album reached number 3 on Hitlisten, the official Danish Albums Chart.

Discography

Albums

Mixtape
2009: B-Mennesket - The Mixtape
2010: Skarpe Skud Part 1 - Startskuddet
2010: Skarpe Skud Part 2 - Barneleg
2011: Skarpe Skud Part 3 - Løb Mens Du Kan
2012: Skarpe Skud Part 4 - Jorden Er Giftig
2013: Skarpe Skud Part 5 - En Chance Til

Singles
2008: "Stadig Beskidt"
2008: "Mørket Falder På"

References

Danish rappers
1984 births
Living people